Haplocochlias is a genus of sea snails, marine gastropod mollusks in the family Skeneidae.

Description
The solid, subperforate shell has a turbinate shape. The aperture is rounded. The thick peristome is continuous and exteriorly varicose. The columella is not callous.

Species
Species within the genus Haplocochlias include:
 Haplocochlias arawakorum Rubio & Rolán, 2015
 Haplocochlias arrondoi Rubio, Fernández-Garcés & Rolán, 2013
 Haplocochlias bellus (Dall, 1889)
 Haplocochlias bieleri Rubio, Fernández-Garcés & Rolán, 2013
 Haplocochlias calidimaris (Pilsbry & McGinty, 1945)
 Haplocochlias christopheri Rubio & Rolán, 2015
 Haplocochlias compactus (Dall, 1889)
 Haplocochlias concepcionensis (Lowe, 1933)
 Haplocochlias cubensis Espinosa, Ortea, Fernandez-Garcés & Moro, 2007
 Haplocochlias cyclophoreus Carpenter, 1864
 Haplocochlias densistriatus Rubio, Rolán & H. G. Lee, 2013
 Haplocochlias erici (Strong & Hertlein, 1939)
 Haplocochlias francesae (Pilsbry & McGinty, 1945)
 Haplocochlias garciai Rubio, Fernández-Garcés & Rolán, 2013
 Haplocochlias harryleei Rubio, Fernández-Garcés & Rolán, 2013
 Haplocochlias karukera Rubio & Rolán, 2015
 Haplocochlias loperi Rubio, Rolán & Lee in Rubio, Fernández-Garcés & Rolán, 2013
 Haplocochlias lucasensis (Strong, 1934)
 Haplocochlias lupita Espinosa & Ortea, 2013
 Haplocochlias minusdentatus Rubio, Rolán & Redfern in Rubio, Fernández-Garcés & Rolán, 2013
 Haplocochlias moolenbeeki De Jong & Coomans, 1988
 Haplocochlias multiliratus Rubio, Fernández-Garcés & Rolán, 2013
 Haplocochlias nunezi Espinosa, Ortea & Fernandez-Garces, 2004
 Haplocochlias onaneyi Espinosa, Ortea & Fernandez-Garces, 2004
 Haplocochlias ortizi Espinosa, Ortea & Fernandez-Garces, 2005
 Haplocochlias pacorubioi Rubio, Fernández-Garcés & Rolán, 2013
 Haplocochlias panamensis Rubio, Fernández-Garcés & Rolán, 2013
 Haplocochlias pauciliratus Rubio, Rolán & Lee in Rubio, Fernández-Garcés & Rolán, 2013
 Haplocochlias risoneideneryae De Barros, dos Santos F.N., Santos, Cabral & Acioli, 2002
 Haplocochlias swifti Vanatta, 1913
 Haplocochlias turbinus (Dall, 1889)
 Haplocochlias williami de Barros et al., 2002
Species brought in to synonymy
 Haplocochlias minutissimus Pilsbry, 1921: synonym of Lophocochlias minutissimus (Pilsbry, 1921)
 Haplocochlias onaneyi Espinosa, Ortea & Fernández-Garcés, 2005: synonym of Haplocochlias williami Barros, Santos, Santos, Cabral & Acioli, 2002 
 Haplocochlias risonideneryae[sic]: synonym of Haplocochlias risoneideneryae Barros, Santos, Santos, Cabral & Acioli, 2002
 Haplocochlias swifti auct. non Vanatta, 1913: synonym of Haplocochlias nunezi Espinosa, Ortea & Fernández-Garcés, 2005

References

External links
 Carpenter P.P. (1864) Diagnoses of new forms of Mollusca collected at Cape St. Lucas, Lower California, by Mr. Xantus. Annals and Magazine of Natural History, (3)13: 311-315; 474-479; (3)14: 45–49
 De Barros, dos Santos F.N., Santos, Cabral & Acioli, 2002; Sobre Duas Espécies Novas de  Haplocochlias Carpenter, 1864 (Prosobranchia, Archaeagastropoda) da Costa do Brasil.

 
Skeneidae
Gastropod genera